Iran Club was an Iranian football club based in Tehran, Iran. It was Iran's first football club and predecessor to Tehran Club. In 1923 all players moved to newly established Tehran Club.

Honours
Tehran Annual Football Association Cup:
Runner Up: 1922
Champion: 1926

References

Defunct football clubs in Iran
Association football clubs established in 1922
Association football clubs disestablished in 1926
Sport in Tehran
1920 establishments in Iran
1923 disestablishments in Iran